The Qosmio series (dynabook Qosmio in Japan) was Toshiba's consumer-marketed line of high performance desktop replacement laptops. The laptop was first released on July 25, 2004 as the E15-AV101 with a 1.7 GHz Intel Pentium M CPU, 512 megabytes of DDR SDRAM, and a 15-inch XGA 1,024 by 768 screen. Toshiba's most powerful laptop has undergone many revisions, with focus shifting from high-end multimedia functionality to heavy gaming. The current line, the X70 series, was released in 2013, featuring an Intel Core i7 processor with up to 32 gigabytes of DDR3 SDRAM and an nVidia Geforce GTX 770M as well as a 17.3 inch Full HD display.

History 

The Toshiba Qosmio G35-AV650 is the first production notebook made available with an HD DVD-compatible drive. The Qosmio G35 line also functioned as a Digital Video Recorder as it contains an integrated TV tuner.

Focus for the Qosmio has shifted from full-fledged multimedia to high end gaming with high quality graphics and audio. This can be seen in the first Qosmio, the E15-AV101, which offered a 1.7 GHz Intel Pentium M 735 CPU, 512 megabytes of DDR SDRAM, a 15-inch XGA 1,024 by 768 screen, and an nVidia GeForce FX Go5200 with 64 MB of dedicated DDR video memory, all of which were relatively powerful for the time. The X500 has an Intel Core i7 processor with up to 6 gigabytes of DDR3 SDRAM as well as an 18.4 inch HD display powered by an nVidia Geforce GTX 460M with 1.5 GB GDDR5. These components, on the other hand, are on the high end of the spectrum in performance.  This original model launched in 2004 with an international marketing campaign. The campaign was featured in every major publication, as well as an ambitious digital campaign, one of the first for a major laptop release at that time.

Models

F45 series
Released on February 7, 2007, the Toshiba F45 series was an upgraded line of F40 laptops with advertised features including Dolby Home Theater and a built-in subwoofer.  The basic specs included an Intel(R) Core(TM) 2 Duo Processor T5450 at 1.66 GHz with 2MB L2 attached to a 64-bit 667 MHz FSB.  Memory was 2048MB PC2-5300 DDR2 SDRAM, DVD was "+/- R double layer", video was Mobile Intel(R) Graphics Media Accelerator X3100 with 8MB-256MB, screen was a 15.4-inch TruBrite(R) display with 1280x800 native resolution (WXGA), and hard drives were about 200GB in size (varied by model).  32-bit editions of Windows Vista Home Premium or Ultimate were normally shipped with the systems.

Toshiba F45 models include: AV410, AV411, AV411B, AV412, AV413, AV423 and AV425

X300 series
Released on January 4, 2009, the Qosmio X300 models offered not only HD DVD reading capabilities but also writing capabilities in either 15GB or 30GB capacities. External audio/video controls were also added to allow for one touch recording. A remote control is available to allow control within 20 feet of the laptop. The X305 is red with flames around its back. The X300 replaces the Satellite X200.
	
 Toshiba Satellite X305 Models include: Q701, Q705, Q706, Q708, Q710, Q711, Q7113, Q712, Q715, Q720, Q7201, Q7203, Q725, Q7253, SP6828A, SP6828C, SP6828R. core2duo and Quad core processors available - GeForce 9700M GTS 512mb graphics available (individual cards; not SLI)

X500 series
Released on October 22, 2009, the X500 comes in many models, including: the X505-Q830, X505-Q832, X505-Q850, X505-Q870, X505-Q875, X505-Q880, and the X500-S1801. The X500 series introduced multi-touch capabilities to its touchpad. It supports Blu-ray playback but only some models are able to write Blu-ray disks. The X500 has a much simpler black and red accented design than its predecessor, the X300.

	
 Other X500 models include: Qosmio brand- Models include: X500-PQX33A, X500-Q840S, X500-Q895S, X500-Q900S, X500-Q930X, X500-S1801, X500-S1811, X500-S1812, X500-S1812X

X770 series
Released on June 14, 2011 Qosmio X770, the X775 series was manufactured by Toshiba and on Aug.9, 2011 the F755 3D laptop was released.

X870 series
Released in 2012 Qosmio X870 series...

X70/75 series

Released in 2013 Qosmio X70-A series with a Nvidia Geforce GTX 770M GPU for gaming and multimedia usage.

Released in 2014 Qosmio X70-B series with a significantly less powerful GPU, an AMD Radeon R9 M265X.

Specifications

Expandability
This section encompasses current models only:
2 DDR3 memory slots supporting up to 8GB
5-in-1 Media Adapter supporting Secure Digital Card, Memory Stick, Memory Stick Pro, MultiMediaCard, and xD-Picture Card
ExpressCard/54
1 each of VGA and HDMI ports

Issues 
The Qosmio F10 and G10 series, both early models, were plagued with chipset issues. When a defective unit was under considerable load for an extended period of time, the video chipset on the board was known to fail, causing considerable interference on the display and/or complete motherboard failure.

References

External links

Notebook Review AV650, Qosmio G30 / Qosmio G35 Review
PC World G35-AV600 Review
PC Mag Qosmio G25-AV513 review
Laptopical G35-AV600 review
Toshiba Qosmio X500 Laptop Series
Toshiba Qosmio X770 Laptop Series
Toshiba Serves Up Elite Mobile Performance With Qosmio X770 and Qosmio X775 3D Series Laptops 

Qosmio
Discontinued products
Consumer electronics brands
Computer-related introductions in 2009
Gaming laptops